The Layer by Layer method, also known as the beginners method, is a method of solving the 3x3x3 Rubik's Cube. Many beginners' methods use this approach, and it also forms the basis of the CFOP speedcubing technique.

History
The Layer by Layer Method was pioneered by David Singmaster in his 1980 book Notes on Rubik's "Magic Cube". The same idea was adopted by James G. Nourse in his The Simple Solution to Rubik's Cube which became the bestselling book of 1981, and similar approaches could be found in Don Taylor's Mastering Rubik's Cube and Cyril Östrop's Solving the Cube from the same era.

Method
The method begins with the puzzle solver making a cross on one face with the edge pieces ensuring that all edge colours match the adjacent center colours (step 1 in the diagram below), then putting the corners into position between the edges (step 2). By then, the layer should be solved. In step 3, the four edge pieces of the middle layer are solved. At this point the first two layers are solved. In step 4, a cross of the opposite color is made on the last layer. For step 5, the last layer edges are permuted (swapped around). In step 6, the last layer corners are permuted. Finally, the last layer corners are oriented.

Most Layer by Layer beginners' methods solve the first two layers using the same technique. However, there are many variant techniques for the final layer, depending on whether the corner or edge pieces are solved first. For example:
 Top layer "white cross": F' U L' U' or F R U R' U' F'
 Top layer left corner: D L D' L’ / right corner: D' R' D R
 Second layer right edge: U R U' R' U' F' U F / Left edge: U' L' U L U F U' F'
 Final layer cross (edge orientation): F R U R' U' F'
 Final layer edge permutation: R U R' U R U U R'
 Final layer corner orientation: U R U' L' U R' U' L
 Final layer corner permutation: R' D' R D

CFOP method

The CFOP speedcubing
technique, developed by Jessica Fridrich and others in the 1980s, similarly divides the puzzle into layers to be solved. However, the method uses far more algorithms and shortcuts than the beginners' methods.

References

Rubik's Cube